The 2010–11 Alabama State Hornets basketball team represented Alabama State University during the 2010–11 NCAA Division I men's basketball season. The Hornets, led by sixth-year head coach Lewis Jackson, played their home games at the Dunn–Oliver Acadome in Montgomery, Alabama as members of the Southwestern Athletic Conference (SWAC). After finishing fourth in the SWAC regular season standings, the Hornets won the SWAC tournament, earning the opportunity to play in the NCAA tournament. Alabama State was beaten in the First Four by UTSA to finish the season 17–18 (11–7 SWAC).

Roster

Schedule and results 

|-
!colspan=12 style=|Regular Season

|-
!colspan=9 style=| SWAC tournament

|-
!colspan=9 style=| NCAA tournament

|-

Sources

References

Alabama State Hornets basketball seasons
Alabama State Hornets
Alabama State
Alabama State Hornets basketball
Alabama State Hornets basketball